Percy Laurence Tetzlaff (14 July 1920 – 30 August 2009) was a New Zealand rugby union player. A halfback, Tetzlaff represented Waikato and Auckland at a provincial level, and was a member of the New Zealand national side, the All Blacks, on their 1947 tour of Australia. He played seven matches for the All Blacks on that tour, including two internationals. At 1.60 m, Tetzlaff was one of the shortest All Blacks ever.

References

1920 births
2009 deaths
Rugby union players from Waikato
New Zealand rugby union players
New Zealand international rugby union players
Waikato rugby union players
Auckland rugby union players
Rugby union scrum-halves